My Tree is a Canadian documentary film, directed by Jason Sherman and released in 2021. The film centres on his trip to Israel to locate a tree that was planted in his name decades earlier.

The film premiered at the 2021 Hot Docs Canadian International Documentary Festival.

The film received a Canadian Screen Award nomination for Best Feature Length Documentary at the 10th Canadian Screen Awards in 2022, and Ben Lawrence won the award for Best Editing in a Documentary,

References

External links

2021 films
2021 documentary films
Canadian documentary films
Films shot in Israel
Jewish Canadian films
2020s English-language films
2020s Canadian films